Andriy Oleksandrovych Kovtun (born 28 February 1968) is a retired Ukrainian professional footballer. He made his professional debut in the Soviet Top League in 1990 for FC Shakhtar Donetsk.

Honours
 Ukrainian Premier League champion: 1993, 1994, 1995, 1996.
 Ukrainian Cup winner: 1993, 1996.

References

1968 births
Living people
Footballers from Nizhyn
Soviet footballers
Ukrainian footballers
Soviet Union under-21 international footballers
Ukraine international footballers
Soviet Top League players
Ukrainian Premier League players
FC Shakhtar Donetsk players
FC Dynamo Kyiv players
FC Dynamo-2 Kyiv players
FC Kryvbas Kryvyi Rih players
FC Knyazha Shchaslyve players
FC Vorskla Poltava players
FC Hoverla Uzhhorod players
Ukrainian football managers
FC CSKA Kyiv managers
NK Veres Rivne managers
Association football goalkeepers